These tables compare free software / open-source operating systems. Where not all of the versions support a feature, the first version which supports it is listed.

General information

Supported architectures

Supported hardware

General

Networking

Network technologies

Supported file systems

Supported file system features

Security features

See also 

    
 Berkeley Software Distribution
 Comparison of operating systems
 Comparison of Linux distributions
 Comparison of BSD operating systems
 Comparison of kernels
 Comparison of file systems
 Comparison of platform virtualization software
 Comparison of DOS operating systems
 List of operating systems
 Live CD
 Microsoft Windows
 RTEMS
 Unix
 Unix-like

References

External links

 
Open Source Operating Systems